Georgetown Summit Wildlife Management Area at  is an Idaho wildlife management areain Bear Lake County near the town of Carey. Land for the WMA was first acquired in 1991 from the Rocky Mountain Elk Foundation near Caribou National Forest. 

The WMA's location on Bear River is a major migratory for waterfowl north of Bear Lake and the Great Salt Lake. The WMA also provides year-round habitat for elk, mule deer, and other wildlife.

References

Protected areas established in 1991
Protected areas of Bear Lake County, Idaho
Wildlife management areas of Idaho
1991 establishments in Idaho